Aloeides nollothi, the Nolloth's copper, is a species of butterfly in the family Lycaenidae. It is found in Namibia and the Northern Cape province of South Africa.

The wingspan is 19–22 mm for males and 20–24 mm females. Adults are on wing from August to December and in late summer (from March to April) in a possible second generation. There is usually one generation per year.

References

Aloeides
Insects of South Africa
Butterflies described in 1977
Butterflies of Africa
Taxonomy articles created by Polbot